Jinxed is a 2013 Canadian-American fantasy-comedy film that premiered on Nickelodeon on November 29, 2013. The film stars Ciara Bravo and Jack Griffo. The film was directed by Stephen Herek and produced by Amy Sydorick & Scott McAboy.

The film was released to DVD on April 8, 2014 and to Blu-ray on December 4, 2015. The premiere of the film was watched by 3.2 million viewers.

Plot
In 1914, the luckiest man in town Tommy Murphy (Burkely Duffield) is overjoyed when the girl of his dreams, Caitlin O'Leary (Andrea Brooks), agrees to dance with him in the town festival despite all rumors that she is a witch (known as a young gypsy woman). The event is ruined when a young woman named Violet (Jessa Danielson) surprises him by showing her feelings for Tommy by kissing him in front of his date. Tommy tries to keep Caitlin from running off, only for him to accidentally tear her dress, revealing her underwear. Feeling humiliated, she curses Tommy and all of his descendants with incredibly bad luck. He tries to find her so they could reconcile and reverse the curse, but is heartbroken when he learns that she married someone else.

One hundred years later, his great-great-granddaughter Meg Murphy (Ciara Bravo) is desperate to end the family's curse. Together with her brother Charlie (Jacob Bertrand), Meg finds Tommy's diary and finds out that to get rid of the curse she needs to give Tommy's "lucky coin" to a descendant of Caitlin.  They successfully manage to steal their great-great-grandfather Tommy's lucky coin from the Harvest Hills Historical Museum. Afterward, Meg realizes that Ivy Murray (Elena Kampouris), a mean girl at school that picks on her, is a descendant of the O'Leary family and decides to give her the coin; her crush, Brett (Jack Griffo), asks her to the festival and she realizes that he's a descendant of Caitlin as well (being Ivy's cousin). At the dance she gives him the lucky coin, hoping to break her curse; however, a piece of Tommy's diary winds up in Charlie's hands and reading it, Charlie realizes the coin just ends up transferring the curse to Brett's family.

Meg is horrified when she discovers what has happened and arrives at his house to witness his house getting ransacked by an angry monkey. Ivy answers the door, and upon learning that the bad luck came from Meg giving Brett the coin, she grows angry. Meg manages to convince Ivy that she never intended for this to happen and Ivy realizes she's always been mean to Meg since her cursed accidents affected her as well but realizes that it's not Meg's fault. The two race to the closing ceremony, where Brett gives Meg the coin back. She then gets struck by lightning and almost falls off a flag tower but is saved by Brett, who then kisses her.

Afterwards, Meg and Ivy become best friends and she and Brett are dating. Meg goes to science camp after all and accidentally invents a potion that grows hair on bald heads. She puts back Tommy's diary with the coin after reading in the last part that Tommy, due to his bad luck, meets his beautiful wife at the hospital and throws his coin into the fountain causing a flood. Even so, he believes that it's the attitude that counts.

Meg and her family go on vacation to visit the Grand Canyon and end up causing more bad luck, with Ivy and Brett running for their lives, but laughing about it.

Cast

 Ciara Bravo as Meg Murphy, the main character, whose family is cursed
 Jacob Bertrand as Charlie Murphy, Meg's younger brother
 Elena Kampouris as Ivy Murray, Brett's cousin
 Jack Griffo as Brett, Ivy's cousin
 Donavon Stinson as Dad, Meg's father
 Keegan Connor Tracy as Mom, Meg's mother
 Jay Brazeau as Grandpa, Meg's grandfather
 Burkely Duffield as Tommy Murphy, Meg's great-great-grandfather
 Andrea Brooks as Caitlin O'Leary, Brett and Ivy's great-great-grandmother
 Jessa Danielson as Violet Maws
 Carmel Amit as Gypsy Woman, a fortune teller
 Kwesi Ameyaw as Mayor

References

External links
 

Films set in Maine
2013 television films
2013 films
American children's comedy films
Canadian children's comedy films
American children's fantasy films
Canadian children's fantasy films
English-language Canadian films
Films directed by Stephen Herek
Films scored by James Dooley
Films shot in Vancouver
Nickelodeon original films
Films set in 1914
Films set in 2013
Films about curses
2010s American films
2010s Canadian films